Jeffrey Bryan Bregel (born May 1, 1964) is a former college and professional football who was a guard in the National Football League (NFL) for three seasons during the late 1980s.  He played college football for the University of Southern California, and thereafter played professionally for the San Francisco 49ers of the NFL.
Bregel is an inductee in the College Football Hall of Fame.
Bregel was born in Redondo Beach, California.

References

1964 births
Living people
All-American college football players
American football offensive guards
Players of American football from California
Sportspeople from Redondo Beach, California
San Francisco 49ers players
USC Trojans football players